Asahan Regency is a regency in North Sumatra, Indonesia. Following the creation of the new Batubara Regency (which was carved out of Asahan Regency on 15 June 2007), the regency now covers an area of 3,702.7 square kilometres; it had a population of 668,272 according to the 2010 census and 769,960 at the 2020 Census. Its administrative centre is now at Kisaran. The Regency surrounds but now does not include the city of Tanjungbalai which was formerly its capital. The Asahan Sultanate was located in the region.

Administrative divisions 
The regency is divided administratively into twenty-five Districts (kecamatan), tabulated below with their areas and their populations at the 2010 Census  and the 2020 Census. The table also includes he locations of the district administrative centres, the number of administrative villages (rural desa and rbankelurahan) in each district and its postal code.

Note: (a) Tanjung Balai District is not part of Tanjungbalai city, but lies between the city and the coast.

References

External links 
Asahan official site
Statistic Of Asahan Regency

Regencies of North Sumatra